Roberto Núñez (born c.1928) was an Argentine gymnast who competed in the 1948 Summer Olympics.

References

External links
 

Gymnasts at the 1948 Summer Olympics
Olympic gymnasts of Argentina
Year of birth missing
Year of death missing
Argentine male artistic gymnasts
Pan American Games medalists in gymnastics
Pan American Games gold medalists for Argentina
Pan American Games silver medalists for Argentina
Gymnasts at the 1951 Pan American Games
20th-century Argentine people